Bregare Point (‘Nos Bregare’ \'nos bre-'ga-re\) is the point projecting 2 km into Crates Bay on the northeast coast of Stresher Peninsula on Graham Coast in Graham Land, Antarctica.  It is named after the settlement of Bregare in Northern Bulgaria.

Location
British mapping in 1976.

Maps
 Antarctic Digital Database (ADD). Scale 1:250000 topographic map of Antarctica. Scientific Committee on Antarctic Research (SCAR). Since 1993, regularly upgraded and updated.
British Antarctic Territory. Scale 1:200000 topographic map. DOS 610 Series, Sheet W 66 64. Directorate of Overseas Surveys, Tolworth, UK, 1976.

References
Bulgarian Antarctic Gazetteer. Antarctic Place-names Commission. (details in Bulgarian, basic data in English)
Bregare Point. SCAR Composite Antarctic Gazetteer.

External links
 Bregare Point. Copernix satellite image

Headlands of Graham Land
Bulgaria and the Antarctic
Graham Coast